Saksit Yuencheewit is a Thai professional footballer.

He previously played for Khonkaen F.C. in Thai Premier League.

References

External links
Kon Division 2
Sport Guru SMM Online
Phuket Gazette
Asean Football

Living people
Saksit Yuencheewit
Saksit Yuencheewit
1991 births
Association football forwards